The Salvator-Dormus pistol is the earliest-patented semi-automatic pistol. It was patented on 11 July 1891, by Archduke Karl Salvator of Austria and Count . As the first of its kind, it was designed without the benefit of experience with earlier models. Various modifications were made with approximately twenty prototypes before thirty pistols of a workable design were submitted for Austrian military trials in 1896. This 8 mm delayed blowback pistol loads through the top and has a hinged magazine door on the butt. The pistol has a separate bolt release and safety. The production delay between patent and military trials allowed comparisons with other self-loading pistols, and the Salvator Dormus was considered inferior to its competition. The designers abandoned this project; and few pistols survive.

References

External links
 1891 Salvator-Dormus: The First Automatic Pistol
 Salvator Dormus Semiautomatic Pistol model 1891—1897

19th-century semi-automatic pistols
Semi-automatic pistols of Austria